David Callender (born 25 July 1930) is a British rower. He competed in the men's coxless pair event at the 1952 Summer Olympics.

References

1930 births
Living people
British male rowers
Olympic rowers of Great Britain
Rowers at the 1952 Summer Olympics
Sportspeople from Norwich